Thomas de Boues was Archdeacon of Totnes during 1215.

References

Archdeacons of Totnes